María Eugenia Suárez Riveiro (born 9 March 1992), better known as China Suárez, is an Argentine actress, singer and model.

Biography 
María Eugenia Suárez Riveiro was born on March 9, 1992, in Buenos Aires, Argentina. She is the daughter of Guillermo Suárez and Marcela Riveiro Mitsumori. She has an older brother named Agustín Suárez. Her maternal grandmother, Marta Mitsumori, was born in Argentina, and is of Japanese descent. Suárez has cousins living in Kōchi Prefecture in Shikoku, Japan. During her childhood, Suárez attended the Instituto Corazón de María up to her third year of secondary school and completed her secondary studies at ESBA Barrio Norte. She also attended Divino Corazón de Jesús, located in Palermo, Buenos Aires, only for 7th grade.

Personal life 
From 2012 to 2013, Suárez dated actor Nicolás Cabré. They have one daughter, Rufina, born on July 18, 2013. From 2015 to 2021, she was in a relationship with actor Benjamín Vicuña, with whom she has two children: daughter Magnolia, born on February 7, 2018, and a son, Amancio, born on July 28, 2020. Since 2022, Suárez has been in a relationship with singer Rusherking.

Career 
Suárez made her debut as an actress when she was eleven years old in the television series Rincón de luz (2003), created by Cris Morena, in which she was part of the children's cast. In 2004 she had a small role in the television series Floricienta playing the younger sister of Muni Seligmann's character. A year later she appeared in Amor mío (Argentina) and in 2006 in the sitcom Amo de casa.

Between 2007 and 2010 Suárez played Jazmín "Jaz" Romero in the television series Casi Ángeles, also created by Cris Morena, and the theatrical adaptations of the show. From the series arose the musical group Teen Angels, of which Suárez was a member. At the beginning of 2011, Suárez left the band and later received the Kids Choice Awards Argentina of "favorite actress" for her work in Casi Ángeles.

Between 2011 and 2012 Suárez was part of the cast of Los Únicos, produced by Pol-ka. She later starred with Nicolás Pauls in the miniseries 30 días juntos, aired on Cosmopolitan TV (Latin America).

In 2013 Suárez went back to working with Pol-ka in the comedy Solamente vos, where she worked with her costar from Casi Angeles, Lali Espósito. In 2014 she co-starred in the telenovela Camino al amor with Mariano Martínez, Sebastián Estevanez and Carina Zampini. Also in 2014, she was invited to star in the second season of Tu cara me suena, aired on Telefe, where she imitated Nicole Kidman from the movie Moulin Rouge! along with fellow actor Fernando Dente. Suárez also starred in the music video for Hoy, by David Bisbal.

In 2015 Suárez made her first appearance on the big screen with the film adaptation of the book Abzurdah. She also recorded her own version of the song Trátame suavemente, by Soda Stereo, for the movie. For her performance she received the Premio Sur for as Best New Actress. On July 18, 2015, Suárez served as the ambassador for Argentine cinema at the Premios Platino. In 2015, she also launched her own clothing line, which includes jackets, blouses, pants, tops, dresses, purses and necklaces.

In 2016 Suárez starred in the romantic comedy , with costar Benjamín Vicuña and director Daniela Goggi. She also voice acted the role of Meena in the Argentinian version of the animated film Sing.

In 2019, Suárez returned to the small screen in the historical telenovela: Argentina, tierra de amor y verganza, produced by Pol-ka. There, she played the role of Raquel, a Polish woman that is tricked into traveling to Argentina by the promise of marrying a rich man, when in reality she is brought there for prostitution. Later, Suárez starred in the series Tu parte del trato, where she played a female police officer.

Filmography

Film

Television

Discography

Singles

Promotional singles

Soundtrack appearances

Awards and nominations

References

External links 
 
 

1992 births
Argentine female models
21st-century Argentine women singers
Argentine stage actresses
Argentine television actresses
Living people
Actresses from Buenos Aires
Argentine people of Japanese descent